Govindrao Wamanrao Adik (4 January 1939    – 7 June 2015 ) was an Indian politician. He was a member of the Nationalist Congress Party and served as a Member of Parliament in the Rajya Sabha. He began his political career as a Member of the Legislative Assembly (MLA) and He is  brothers of  Adv. Ramrao Adik 3rd Deputy Chief Minister of Maharashtra

Early life

Govindrao Wamanrao Adik was born in Khanapur village of Shrirampur Taluka on January 4, 1939, in the family of Smt. Jankibai Adik and Shri. Wamanrao Adik. Adik was the youngest in the family and had four brothers and one sister. His brothers were Adv. Ramrao Wamanrao Adik (Ex. Deputy Chief Minister of Maharashtra), Adv. Laxmanrao Wamanrao Adik, Keshavrao Wamanrao Adik, and his sister was Smt. Shantabai Rajaram Varkad. His son Avinash Govindrao Adik is the Spokesperson and General Secretary of NCP and his daughter Anuradha Govindrao Adik is the President of Shrirampur Municipal council.

Political career

He was instrumental in the formation of ‘Mula Pravara Electric Cooperative society’ along with late Shri. Baburao dada Tanpure of Rahuri, a senior leader in the state co-operative movement. The two were co-promoters of this electric co-operative society, which was one of five similar proposals nationally. Late Shri. Annasaheb Shinde (Former Minister of state, Agriculture, GOI) was the guiding force and supported them.

Adik become a member of the state cabinet in Maharashtra for the first time in 1978-80 and served as Minister for Irrigation, Command Area Development, and Law and Judiciary in the Progressive Democratic Front, government under the chief Ministership of Shri. Sharad Pawar. In 1989, he was appointed chairman of MSRTC (Maharashtra State Road Transport Corporation) and given status of a state cabinet minister. Adik turned the loss-making Corporation into a profitable enterprise.

Adik was elected to the Rajya Sabha (Indian National Congress) from Maharashtra Legislative Assembly Constituency in a by election for the first time in 1993. He was then reelected.

At various times, he served as President of Maharashtra Pradesh Congress committee, President of Indian National Trade Union Congress (INTUC), President of Rashtriya Mill Mazdoor Sangh (RMMS), President of Maharashtra Rajya Rashtriya Sakhar Kamgar Sanghatana, and President of Maharashtra Maharashtra Rajya Rashtriya S. T. Kamgar Sanghatana.

Switch to Nationalist Congress Party 
He served as Agriculture Minister in Maharashtra Cabinet from 2003 to 2005. He was an associate of Sharad Pawar before Pawar split from INC to form NCP. Adik remained in the INC. He commanded support in rural areas, especially western Maharashtra. Adik welcomed the appointment of Ashok Chavan as Chief Minister of Maharashtra and expressed hope that he would retain his clean image and restore the party's reputation. In 2009 Adik expected to be inducted into the state cabinet by Chavan. Instead, the post went to Shri Radhekrishna Vikhe Patil. This disappointed Adik, who had been expecting a berth since 2005. He then resigned from INC membership to join NCP. He later was elected again in 2009, representing NCP. He served as NCP National General Secretary.

References

Political Position
Govindrao Adik, held the following positions throughout his tenure:

1. President of Maharashtra Pradesh Congress Committee.

2. President of Indian National Trade union Congress (INTUC).

3. President of Rashtriya Mill Mazdoor Sangh  RMMS).

4. President of Maharashtra Rajya Rashtriya Sakhar Kamgar Sanghatana.

5. President of Maharashtra Rajya Rashtriya S. T. Kamgar Sanghatana.

External links
Official list of members of Parliament

Nationalist Congress Party politicians from Maharashtra
Rajya Sabha members from Maharashtra
1939 births
2015 deaths
People from Shrirampur
Marathi politicians
Indian National Congress (U) politicians
Indian National Congress politicians from Maharashtra